The Song Remains Not the Same is a compilation album by American heavy metal band Black Label Society, released on May 10, 2011. It features new cover songs, acoustic versions of songs originally released on Order of the Black, and compiles bonus tracks from various releases of that album. The Song Remains Not the Same reached No. 41 on the Billboard 200 albums chart.

The whole album was available live streaming on May 9, 2011, via AOL Music.

Track listing

Personnel
Black Label Society
Zakk Wylde – vocals, guitars, piano
John DeServio – bass, backing vocals
Will Hunt – drums
John Rich – guest vocals on track 9

Production
Produced by Zakk Wylde
Associate producer – John DeServio
Engineered by Adam Klumpp
Mixed by Zakk Wylde, John DeServio, Adam Klumpp
Mastered by George Marino
Management – Bob Ringe (Survival Management)
Publicity – Carise Yatter (Hired Gun Media), Darren Edwards
Marketing, Internet – Jim Baltutis (Concepts in Concert), Denner Vieira, Angela McGill
Artwork, layout, and design – John Irwin (John Irwin Design), Zakk Wylde

Charts

References

Black Label Society albums
2011 compilation albums
MNRK Music Group compilation albums